Under the Whyte notation for the classification of steam locomotives, 4-4-4 represents the wheel arrangement of four leading wheels on two axles, four powered and coupled driving wheels on two axles, and four trailing wheels on two axles.  In the United States, this arrangement was named the Reading type, since the Philadelphia and Reading Railroad was the first to use it.  In Canada, this type is known as the Jubilee.

Other equivalent classifications are:
UIC classification: 2B2 (also known as German classification and Italian classification)
French classification: 222
Turkish classification: 26
Swiss classification: 2/6

Usage

Bavarian Railways
A single, experimental 4-4-4, classified as S 2/6, was built for the Royal Bavarian State Railway Company in 1906 by the firm of J.A. Maffei. It was successful in an experimental sense but was too light to haul passenger trains of useful capacity. It was fast, attaining  on test, and was semi-streamlined with a pointed nosecone and fairings around the cylinders, stack and dome, and slanted-back cab windows. It inspired the later Bavarian S 3/6 4-6-2 "Pacifics". It passed to the Deutsche Reichseisenbahnen when the German railways were centralised, and was classified as BR 15, number 15 001. It was taken out of service in 1925, and was restored by Maffei to be exhibited at the Munich Transport Exhibition of that year. After the exhibition ended, it was placed in the Nuremberg Transport Museum, where it remains.

Reading Railroad
The Philadelphia and Reading Railway built four C1a Class locomotives in 1915.  They proved to be quite unstable; after that year, they were rebuilt to 4-4-2 "Atlantic" locomotives. The Baltimore and Ohio Railroad created a single 4-4-4 in 1934, rebuilding a 4-4-2 "Atlantic" into a solitary class J-1, named Lady Baltimore.  Along with the single class V-2 4-6-4 Lord Baltimore, it was built for new lightweight passenger trains, in the Lady Baltimore'''s case the Abraham Lincoln on the Chicago and Alton Railroad, a wholly owned subsidiary of the B&O. Despite the Alton's flat territory and straight track, the locomotive did not do well.  It was returned to the B&O and was again modified at the railroad's Mount Clare shops, a less streamlined cab and front end being fitted.  Subsequently, it was placed into local service on the railroad's Wheeling Division, mostly operating between Holloway and Cleveland, Ohio. It proved no more successful in that service, and was sent to the B&O's Riverside Shop for storage; it was scrapped in 1949.

Canadian Pacific

The Canadian Pacific Railway built two classes of 4-4-4 "Jubilee" locomotives.  Both were semi-streamlined, in a similar fashion to the 4-6-4 "Royal Hudson" and 2-10-4 "Selkirk" locomotives.  The F2a was styled after the Milwaukee Road "Hiawatha"  "Atlantic", but with a four-wheel trailing truck to support a longer firebox.

Class F2a consisted of five locomotives, Nos. 3000-3004.  They can be most easily distinguished from the other type through the main rods being connected to the leading pair of drivers.  Some trouble was discovered with this arrangement, as they had a tendency to bend the main rods in reverse.  However, they did hold the Canadian record for speed, at 112.5 mph, during a braking test.  The pilot was smoothly rounded and streamlined, with two stainless-steel bands.  None of this group survive.

Class F1a consisted of twenty locomotives, Nos. 2910-2929.  These had the main rods connected to the trailing set of drivers, and a more regular pilot, with a straight pilot beam, a drop-coupler sheet steel pilot below that, and a more regular front deck.  Two of this class of locomotive, Nos. 2928 and 2929, have survived.  No. 2928 is at the Canadian Railway Museum in Delson, Quebec, while No. 2929 is at Steamtown National Historic Site in Scranton, Pennsylvania.

Britain
In Britain the 4-4-4 arrangement was confined to tank locomotives and there to specific applications requiring either high speed stability in both directions (created by a symmetrical arrangement with bogies front and rear) or a powerful locomotive with as short a fixed wheelbase as possible. Eric G. Barker designed three examples for the Wirral Railway in 1896. The Midland and South Western Junction Railway purchased two 4-4-4 tank engines from Sharp, Stewart and Company but these were not a success due to their poor traction. The North Eastern Railway Class D was designed by Vincent Raven in 1913. Between 1931 and 1936 they were rebuilt with a 4-6-2T wheel layout and re-classified as A8. The H Class locomotives built for the Metropolitan Railway in the 1920s are an example of both these factors leading to a rare use of the 4-4-4 arrangement.
-

Australia
The Western Australia Government Railway N Class 4-4-4 tank locomotives were introduced in 1896.

Hungary
MÁVAG introduced some MÁV Class 242 4-4-4 streamlined tank locomotives between 1936 and 1939.

India

The Vishveshwaraiah Iron and Steel Company, Bhadravati introduces a Class-E 4-4-4T steam locomotive of the North British Locomotive Company in March 1921.  The locomotive no. 22782 was built in the Atlas Works, Glasgow in 1920, one of 23 of this type.  It is currently exhibited in the Railway Museum in the Mysore Junction Railway Station.

Uruguay
The "D type" 4-4-4T of the Central Uruguay Railway were eight locomotives (Vulcan Foundry 1913 and 1915) for use in the suburban services around Montevideo Central Station.

 References 

 See more 
 Ehrenreich, Thomas. 1915 Reading Company Locomotive 110.  Retrieved on May 18, 2005.
 Barris, Wes. SteamLocomotive.com: Surviving Streamlined Steam''.  Retrieved on May 18, 2005.
 
 

 
4,4-4-4
Canadian Pacific Railway locomotives
Philadelphia and Reading Railroad locomotives
Locomotives of Bavaria
Railway locomotives introduced in 1906